The Red Line is an American drama limited television series created and written by Caitlin Parrish and Erica Weiss which premiered on CBS on April 28 and concluded on May 19, 2019.

It stars Noah Wyle, Emayatzy Corinealdi, Aliyah Royale, Noel Fisher, Michael Patrick Thornton, Vinny Chhibber, Howard Charles and Elizabeth Laidlaw. The title refers to a rapid transit line in Chicago, Illinois run by the Chicago Transit Authority (CTA) as part of the city's "L" system.

Premise
The Red Lines plot involves a white cop in Chicago who mistakenly shoots and kills a black doctor. It follows three different families with connections to the case: the victim's husband and their adopted daughter; the daughter's birth mother, who is running for city council, who is married with a young son; and the policeman, whose brother is a paraplegic ex-cop and whose father is a retired police captain.

Cast and characters
 Noah Wyle as Daniel Calder, a high school teacher whose husband, Harrison Brennan, is mistakenly shot by a Chicago Police Department (CPD) officer
 Noel Fisher as CPD Officer Paul Evans
 Michael Patrick Thornton as Jim Evans, Paul's paraplegic brother and former CPD officer
 Aliyah Royale as Jira Calder-Brennan, Daniel and Harrison's adopted teenaged daughter
 Vinny Chhibber as Liam, Jira's literature teacher, Daniel's colleague and emerging love interest
 Emayatzy Corinealdi as Tia Young, Jira's birth mother, campaigning against the CPD's responsibility for the city's nearly 600 annual murders
 Howard Charles as Ethan Young, Tia's husband, a motorman on the Chicago Transit Authority’s elevated Red Line
 Elizabeth Laidlaw as Victoria “Vic” Renna, Paul's police partner
 Enuka Okuma as Suzanne Davis, Tia's sister and campaign manager
 Glynn Turman as Nathan Gordon, incumbent alderman and Tia's opponent

Episodes

Production

Development 
On February 5, 2018, it was announced that CBS had given the production a put pilot commitment after multiple networks had shown interest. The pilot was written by both Caitlin Parrish and Erica Weiss who was expected to executive produce alongside Ava DuVernay and Greg Berlanti. Production companies involved with the pilot were slated to consist of Berlanti Productions, Array Filmworks, CBS Television Studios and Warner Bros. Television. On March 1, 2018, it was announced that Victoria Mahoney would direct the pilot. On May 11, 2018, it was announced that CBS had given the production a series order. A few days later, it was announced that the series would premiere in the spring of 2019 as a mid-season replacement.

On June 7, 2019, CBS announced that The Red Line would not return for another season.

Casting 
In February 2018, it was announced that Noel Fisher, Michael Patrick Thornton, Noah Wyle, Vinny Chhibber, Howard Charles and Elizabeth Laidlaw had joined the pilot's main cast.

Reception

Critical response
On review aggregator Rotten Tomatoes, the series holds an approval rating of 72% based on 18 reviews, with an average rating of 6.8/10. The website's critical consensus reads, "If not always graceful, The Red Line is never less than empathetic, effectively applying tried and true storytelling techniques in its attempts to untangle complicated cultural issues." On Metacritic, it has a weighted average score of 65 out of 100, based on 16 critics, indicating "generally favorable reviews".

Ratings

References

External links

 
 

2010s American LGBT-related drama television series
2010s American drama television series
2019 American television series debuts
2019 American television series endings
CBS original programming
English-language television shows
Television series by CBS Studios
Television series by Warner Bros. Television Studios
Television shows set in Chicago